The Antonine Plague of AD 165 to 180, also known as the Plague of Galen (after Galen, the Greek physician who described it), was the first known pandemic impacting the Roman Empire, possibly contracted and spread by soldiers who were returning from campaign in the Near East. Scholars generally believe the plague was smallpox, although measles has also been suggested. In AD 169 the plague may have claimed the life of the Roman emperor Lucius Verus, who was co-regnant with Marcus Aurelius. These two emperors had risen to the throne by virtue of being adopted by the previous emperor, Antoninus Pius, and as a result, their family name, Antoninus, has become associated with the pandemic.

Ancient sources agree that the plague likely appeared during the Roman siege of the Mesopotamian city of Seleucia in the winter of 165–166. Ammianus Marcellinus reported that the plague spread to Gaul and to the legions along the Rhine. Eutropius stated that a large proportion of the empire's population died from this outbreak. According to the contemporary Roman historian Cassius Dio, the disease broke out again 9 years later in 189 AD and caused up to 2,000 deaths a day in the city of Rome, 25% of those who were affected. The total death count has been estimated at 5–10 million, roughly 10% of the population of the empire. The disease was particularly deadly in the cities and in the Roman army.

The Antonine plague occurred during the last years of what is called the Pax Romana, the high point in the influence, territorial control, and population of the Roman Empire. Historians differ in their opinions of the impact of the plague on the empire in the increasingly troubled eras after its appearance.

Economic growth and poor health
Epidemics were common in the ancient world, but the Antonine plague was the first known pandemic of the Roman Empire. The Antonine plague spread throughout the Roman Empire, and perhaps other areas, including China, and infected many millions of people. The pandemic erupted during the last years of what is often considered the "golden age" of Rome during the reign of co-emperor Marcus Aurelius. The Roman Empire at that time had a population estimated at 75 million people, about one-fourth of all mankind. Historians generally agree that the population of the Roman Empire peaked at about the time that the Antonine Plague appeared and, thereafter, population declined.

The economic prosperity of the Roman Empire notwithstanding, the conditions were propitious for a pandemic.  The population was unhealthy. About 20 percent of the population—a large percentage by ancient standards—lived in one of hundreds of cities; Rome, with a population estimated at one million, being the largest. The cities were a "demographic sink" even in the best of times. The death rate exceeded the birth rate and a constant in-migration of new residents was necessary to maintain the urban population.  As perhaps more than one-half of children died before reaching adulthood, the average life expectancy at birth was only in the mid-twenties.  Dense urban populations and poor sanitation contributed to the dangers of disease.  The connectivity by land and sea between the vast territories of the Roman Empire made the transfer of infectious diseases from one region to another easier and more rapid than it was in smaller, more geographically confined societies. Epidemics of infectious diseases in the empire were common, with nine recorded between 43 BCE and 148 CE. The rich were not immune to the unhealthy conditions. Only two of emperor Marcus Aurelius' fourteen children are known to have reached adulthood.

A good indicator of nutrition and the disease burden is the average height of the population.  The conclusion of the study of thousands of skeletons is that the average Roman was shorter in stature than the people of pre-Roman societies of Italy and the post-Roman societies of the Middle Ages. The view of historian Kyle Harper is that "not for the last time in history, a precocious leap forward in social development brought biological reverses". Despite increasing development, average height did not increase in Europe between 1000 and 1800, while it increased in the 5th and 6th centuries during late antiquity.

Spread of the disease
The traditional Roman view attributed the cause of the Antonine plague to the violation by the Roman army of a temple in the city of Seleucia and carried back to the Roman Empire by soldiers.  However, the first documented case of the plague was in Smyrna in 165 where the orator Aelius Aristides almost died from the disease.  From the east the plague spread westward reaching Rome in 166 and nearly every corner of the empire by 172. The co-emperor Lucius Verus died from the plague in 169 and it ravaged the Roman army.

The plague endured until about 180 and another epidemic, possibly related, is reported by Dio Cassius to have struck the city of Rome in 189. Two thousand people in the city often died on a single day. Whether this new epidemic, or reoccurrence of the Antonine plague, impacted the empire outside the city of Rome is unknown.

Epidemiology 

In 166, during the epidemic, the Greek physician and writer Galen traveled from Rome to his home in Asia Minor and returned to Rome in 168, when he was summoned by the two Augusti, the co-emperors Marcus Aurelius and Lucius Verus. He was present at the outbreak among troops stationed at Aquileia in the winter of 168/69. Galen briefly recorded observations and a description of the epidemic in the treatise Methodus Medendi ("Method of Treatment"), and he scattered other references to it among his voluminous writings. He described the plague as "great" and of long duration, and mentioned fever, diarrhea, and pharyngitis as well as a skin eruption, sometimes dry and sometimes pustular, that appeared on the 9th day of the illness. The information that was provided by Galen does not unambiguously identify the nature of the disease, but scholars have generally preferred to diagnose it as smallpox.

The historian William H. McNeill asserts that the Antonine Plague and the later Plague of Cyprian (251–c. 270) were outbreaks of two different diseases, one of smallpox and one of measles but not necessarily in that order. The severe devastation to the European population from the two plagues may indicate that people had no previous exposure to either disease, which brought immunity to survivors. Other historians believe that both outbreaks involved smallpox. The latter view is bolstered by molecular estimates that place the evolution of measles sometime after 1000 AD. However, Galen's description of the Antonine Plague is not completely consistent with smallpox.

Impact
Historians differ in their assessment of the impact of the Antonine Plague on Rome. To some, the plague was the beginning of the decline of the Roman Empire. To others, it was a minor event, documented by Galen and other writers but only slightly more deadly than other epidemics which frequently ravaged parts of the empire. Estimates of the fatalities from the pandemic range from 2 to 33% of the Roman Empire's population with deaths between 1.5 and 25 million people. Most estimates coalesce around a fatality rate of about 10% (7.5 million people) of the total population of the empire with death rates of up to 15% in the cities and the army. If the pandemic was indeed smallpox, the number who died would've probably been about 25% of those infected as the survival rate from smallpox is often around 75%, or 3 out of 4 people infected.

The traditional view was expressed by Barthold Georg Niebuhr (1776–1831) who concluded that "as the reign of Marcus Aurelius forms a turning point in so many things, and above all in literature and art, I have no doubt that this crisis was brought about by that plague.... The ancient world never recovered from the blow inflicted on it by the plague which visited it in the reign of Marcus Aurelius." More recently, scholar Kyle Harper said something similar: the pandemic "in any account of Rome's destiny ... merit[s] a place squarely in the forefront."
To the contrary, a team of six historians questioned the "extreme" position of Harper and others on this plague "by ignoring scholarship that suggests it had a less than catastrophic outcome," but the historians affirmed that "we do not doubt that disease and climate had some of the impact Harper describes."

Some historians have hypothesized that the epidemic resulted in a surge in the popularity of the cult of Asclepius, the god of medicine; epigraphic evidence, however, suggests no such increase in the cult's popularity occurred.

Impact on the Roman army

The ancient chroniclers portray the plague as a disaster for the Roman army with the army "reduced almost to extinction." This came in 166 at the beginning at the Marcomannic Wars in which Germanic tribes were invading Roman territory south of the middle Danube River in what is now the Czech Republic and Slovakia, and south to Italy.  The impact of the plague forced Marcus Aurelius to recruit and train additional soldiers from among "gladiators, slaves, and bandits." After a delay of two years, in 169 the emperor launched an attack against the Germanic tribes. By 171, the Roman army had driven the invaders out of Roman territory. The war would continue sporadically until 180 when Marcus Aurelius died, possibly of the plague. The plague may also have impacted the Germanic tribes.

Indian Ocean trade and Han China

Although Ge Hong was the first writer of traditional Chinese medicine who accurately described the symptoms of smallpox, the historian Rafe de Crespigny mused that the plagues afflicting the Eastern Han Empire during the reigns of Emperor Huan of Han (r. 146–168) and Emperor Ling of Han (r. 168–189) – with outbreaks in 151, 161, 171, 173, 179, 182, and 185 – were perhaps connected to the Antonine plague on the western end of Eurasia. De Crespigny suggests that the plagues led to the rise of the cult faith healing millenarian movement led by Zhang Jue (d. 184), who instigated the disastrous Yellow Turban Rebellion (184–205). He also stated that "it may be only chance" that the outbreak of the Antonine plague in 166 coincides with the Roman embassy of "Daqin" (the Roman Empire) landing in Jiaozhi (northern Vietnam) and visiting the Han court of Emperor Huan, claiming to represent "Andun" (a transliteration of Marcus Aurelius Antoninus or his predecessor Antoninus Pius).

Raoul McLaughlin wrote that the Roman subjects visiting the Han Chinese court in 166 could have ushered in a new era of Roman Far East trade, but it was a "harbinger of something much more ominous" instead. McLaughlin surmised that the origins of the plague lay in Central Asia, from some unknown and isolated population group, which then spread to the Chinese and the Roman worlds. The plague caused "irreparable" damage to the Roman maritime trade in the Indian Ocean as proven by the archaeological record spanning from Egypt to India as well as significantly decreased Roman commercial activity in Southeast Asia. However, as evidenced by the 3rd-century Periplus of the Erythraean Sea and the 6th-century Christian Topography by Cosmas Indicopleustes, Roman maritime trade into the Indian Ocean, particularly in the silk and spice trades, certainly did not cease but continued until the loss of Egypt to the Muslim Rashidun Caliphate.

See also 
 List of epidemics

Citations

General and cited references 
 Bruun, Christer, "The Antonine Plague and the 'Third-Century Crisis, in Olivier Hekster, Gerda de Kleijn, Danielle Slootjes (ed.), Crises and the Roman Empire: Proceedings of the Seventh Workshop of the International Network Impact of Empire, Nijmegen, June 20–24, 2006. Leiden/Boston:  Brill, 2007 (Impact of Empire, 7), 201–218.
 de Crespigny, Rafe (2007). A Biographical Dictionary of Later Han to the Three Kingdoms (23–220 AD). Leiden: Koninklijke Brill, pp. 514–515, .
 Gilliam, J. F. "The Plague Under Marcus Aurelius". American Journal of Philology 82.3 (July 1961), pp. 225–251.
 Hill, John E. (2009). Through the Jade Gate to Rome: A Study of the Silk Routes during the Later Han Dynasty, First to Second Centuries CE. BookSurge. .
 
 Marcus Aurelius. Meditations IX.2.  Translation and Introduction by Maxwell Staniforth, Penguin, New York, 1981.
 McNeill, William H. Plagues and Peoples. Bantam Doubleday Dell Publishing Group, Inc., New York, 1976. .
 Pulleyblank, Edwin G. "The Roman Empire as Known to Han China", Journal of the American Oriental Society, Vol. 119 (1999), pp. 71–79
 Zinsser, Hans. Rats, Lice and History: A Chronicle of Disease, Plagues, and Pestilence (1935). Reprinted by Black Dog & Leventhal Publishers, Inc. in 1996. .

Pandemics
Nerva–Antonine dynasty
Ancient Roman medicine
2nd-century disasters
Ancient health disasters
Smallpox epidemics
160s
170s
160s in the Roman Empire
170s in the Roman Empire